Hotel Charlotte was a 13-story hotel in Charlotte, North Carolina, which opened in 1929. It was on the corner of Trade Street and Poplar Street in the Uptown area of Charlotte.

While primarily known by the name "Hotel Charlotte", it also operated under the names "Queen Charlotte Hotel" and "White House Inn." It closed on December 31, 1973. It was designed by William Lee Stoddart and was a steel-frame building sheathed with sections of gray granite and a buff-colored brick. It housed 250 guest rooms.

It was listed on the National Register of Historic Places on July 2, 1979.

In the years following its closure, attempts were made to find developers who could rehabilitate and preserve the structure. However, as the building languished, it was severely vandalized and much of its interior plumbing and wiring stolen by looters. Hotel Charlotte was imploded on November 6, 1988. David Copperfield used the implosion as the setting for his escape in the TV special The Explosive Encounter. 
A restaurant of the same name was created in its honor and reused many interior pieces from the original hotel. The restaurant ceased operations on January 29, 2011.

References

External links
 Video of the implosion

Hotel buildings on the National Register of Historic Places in North Carolina
Hotel buildings completed in 1924
Hotels in Charlotte, North Carolina
Hotel Charlotte
Hotel Charlotte
Hotels established in 1924
Buildings and structures demolished in 1988
Skyscraper hotels in Charlotte, North Carolina
Hotel Charlotte
Demolished buildings and structures in North Carolina
Demolished hotels in the United States
Buildings and structures demolished by controlled implosion
1924 establishments in North Carolina
1973 disestablishments in North Carolina